Six women's teams competed in basketball at the 1980 Summer Olympics.

The following players represented Bulgaria:

 Nadka Golcheva
 Penka Metodieva
 Petkana Makaveeva
 Snezhana Mikhaylova
 Krasimira Bogdanova
 Diana Dilova-Braynova
 Penka Stoyanova
 Vanya Dermendzhieva
 Angelina Mikhaylova
 Evladiya Slavcheva-Stefanova
 Kostadinka Radkova
 Silviya Germanova

The following players represented Cuba:

 Andrea Borrell
 Bárbara Bécquer
 Caridad Despaigne
 Inocenta Corvea
 María de los Santos
 María Moret
 Matilde Charro
 Nancy Atiez
 Santa Margarita Skeet
 Sonia de la Paz
 Vicenta Salmón
 Virginia Pérez

The following players represented Hungary:

 Ágnes Németh
 Erzsébet Szentesi
 Éva Gulyás
 Györgyi Vertetics
 Ildikó Gulyás
 Ilona Kovács
 Ilona Lőrincz
 Judit Medgyesi
 Katalin Szuchy
 Lenke Jacsó-Kiss
 Magdolna Gulyás
 Zsuzsa Boksay

The following players represented Italy:

 Antonietta Baistrocchi
 Bianca Rossi
 Chiara Guzzonato
 Emanuela Silimbani
 Lidia Gorlin
 Mariangela Piancastelli
 Marinella Draghetti
 Nunziata Serradimigni
 Orietta Grossi
 Roberta Faccin
 Rosanna Vergnano
 Wanda Sandon

The following players represented the Soviet Union:

 Angelė Rupšienė
 Tetiana Zakharova-Nadyrova
 Olga Barysheva-Korostelyova
 Tatyana Ovechkina
 Nadezhda Shuvayeva-Olkhova
 Uljana Semjonova
 Nelli Feryabnikova
 Olga Sukharnova
 Lyubov Sharmay
 Vida Beselienė
 Lyudmila Rogozhina
 Tatyana Ivinskaya

The following players represented Yugoslavia:

 Vera Ðurašković
 Mersada Bećirspahić
 Jelica Komnenović
 Mira Bjedov
 Vukica Mitić
 Sanja Ožegović
 Sofija Pekić
 Marija Tonković
 Zorica Ðurković
 Vesna Despotović
 Biljana Majstorović
 Jasmina Perazić

References

1980